The Great Western Railway of Colorado  operates about  of track in Colorado and interchanges with the Union Pacific Railroad as well as the BNSF Railway.  It is currently a subsidiary of OmniTRAX but was founded in 1902 to serve the Great Western Sugar Company and other sugar beet and molasses companies in Colorado, and built by another Great Western subsidiary, Loveland Construction Company.  It also operated passenger services from 1917 to 1926.  Their route consists of a line from Loveland to Johnstown, Colorado, where it splits to Miliken and Longmont. Going north out of Kelim is Windsor where once again the line splits to go to their industrial park and Greeley, or Fort Collins. It has since expanded service to include customers such as Anheuser-Busch, Eastman Kodak and Simplot.

See also
Great Western 90, one of Great Western's former locomotives
Great Western 60

References

Further reading

External links

GW 296 

Colorado railroads
Railway companies established in 1902
OmniTRAX
Defunct California railroads
Defunct Oregon railroads